Michael Rutt (born October 28, 1987) is an American middle-distance runner. In August 2014, Michael was hired as the assistant Track and Field Coach at The College of New Jersey. In August 2016, Michael left TCNJ to join the University Massachusetts-Lowell Track and Field Team as the assistant Track and Field Coach.

Achievements

References
 

1987 births
Living people
American male middle-distance runners